Martin Brian Spanjers (born February 2, 1987) is an American actor. He played Rory Hennessy on the ABC sitcom 8 Simple Rules from 2002 to 2005, for which he won a Young Artist Award in 2004, and as Justin in Good Luck Charlie (2010-2014).

Life and career
Spanjers was born in Tucson, Arizona. His father, Frank, is a facilities administrator, and his mother, Sara, is an artist. He has an older brother, Matt. His paternal grandparents emigrated from the Netherlands, settling in Wisconsin. Spanjers auditioned for the starring role of Malcolm in Malcolm in the Middle, almost getting it, but did get a guest spot in the show's pilot episode. Although he did not make it to Malcolm, he was able to show up in 8 Simple Rules For Dating My Teenage Daughter. Spanjers made a guest appearance as Davie in the first episode of the fourth season of Cold Case, "Rampage". He made guest appearances in many other TV shows as well. He currently resides in Los Angeles, California.

In 2006 he provided the voice for Sugimura in the English dub of the Studio Ghibli film Whisper of the Heart. Spanjers appeared as Randy Randinger in the sports spoof The Comebacks, released on October 19, 2007. He also shot  commercials for Pizza Hut double stuffed pizza, Sprint Nextel and T-Mobile.

Spanjers appeared in a music video for the group Three Loco, which includes Andy Milonakis, Dirt Nasty, and Riff Raff.

Filmography

Awards

References

External links
 
 

American male child actors
American male film actors
American male television actors
American male voice actors
American people of Dutch descent
Living people
21st-century American male actors
Male actors from Tucson, Arizona
1987 births